We Also Made History: Women in the Ambedkarite Movement is the very first book detailing the history of women’s qualified participation in the  Dalit movement in India, led by B. R. Ambedkar. Originally written and edited in Marathi by Urmila Pawar and Meenakshi Moon, and published in 1989, the 2008 English translation is by Wandana Sonalkar.

The book is divided into two sections: the first is a historical analysis of the participation and role of women in the Ambedkar movement, and of previous Dalit struggles in the twentieth century. The second part of the book comprises interviews and brief biographies of 45 Dalit women. These women include Ramabai Ambedkar, Dr. Ambedkar's first wife; Sulochanabai Dongre, the chair of the women's conference at the founding of the All India Scheduled Castes Federation in 1942; and Sakhubai Mohite, who was elected president of the All India Buddhist Women's Association in 1956, after she joined Ambedkar in converting to Buddhism as a protest against the Hindu caste system.

The book is described as "a treasure to Dalit and Dalit feminist studies", laying open critical issues in "feminist historiography, without resorting to abstract theoretical notions".

References

Dalit
Feminist books
Indian books
20th-century Indian books
Dalit literature
Cultural depictions of B. R. Ambedkar